Staravina is a small village in the municipality of Novaci, North Macedonia. It used to be a municipality of its own and its FIPS code was MK95.

Demographics

According to the 2002 census, the village had a total of 23 inhabitants. Ethnic groups in the village include:

Macedonians 22
Serbs 1

References

Villages in Novaci Municipality